Tokyo Nagarile Viseshangal is a 1999 Indian Malayalam-language action comedy-drama film directed by Jose Thomas and written by Udaykrishna–Sibi K. Thomas. The film stars Mukesh, Jagathy Sreekumar, Prem Kumar and Tony. The film's musical score is by S. P. Venkatesh, Sunny Stephen and Violin Jacob. The film was originally released without a title and was titled post-release.

Cast
Mukesh as Chenkalcheri Chandrappan
Vijayaraghavan as Kadappuram Karunan
Jagathy Sreekumar as Col. R. K. Nair
Maathu as Ganga
 Athira as Gadha Menon
Prem Kumar as S. I. 
Tony as Peter
George as Dinesh
Bindu Panicker as Chandramathi
C. I. Paul as Gopalan Nair
Harishree Ashokan as Vikram Bolaram Singh
Oduvil Unnikrishnan as Unikrishna Menon
Kanakalatha as Kanakam Unnikrishan
Darshana
Priyanka as Chocolate Rani
Baiju Ezhupuna as Irumbukai Mathachen
Salim Kumar as Kadappuram Paarayi

Actor Motta Rajendran appears as one of the thugs fighting Kadappuram Karunan as he was working as a stunt double in the movie. As it was before his accident, Rajendran can be seen with his hair, facial hair.

Title
The film was released without a name, the makers asking the audience for suggestions and offering a prize to whoever came up with the best one. They finally selected Tokyo Nagarile Visheshangal from the list of suggested names.

Soundtrack
The music was composed by S. P. Venkatesh, Sunny Stephen, and Violin Jacob and the lyrics were written by Balu Kiriyath and Gireesh Puthenchery.

References

External links
 

1999 films
1990s Malayalam-language films
Films directed by Jose Thomas